Gena Showalter (born 1975 in Oklahoma) is an American author in the genres of contemporary romance, paranormal romance, and young adult.

Showalter sold her first book at the age of 27, and has published over 70 books. She has been named by The New York Times and USA Today as a bestselling author. Showalter has successfully published in the adult and young adult market.

Awards 

Alice in Zombieland was the winner of the 2014 South Carolina Children's, Junior and Young Adult Book Award.

Bibliography

Adult Paranormal Romance

Stand Alone Novels

Imperia 

 The Stone Prince, September 2003 
 Prince of Forever, February 2005  (formerly The Pleasure Slave)

Alien Huntress

Atlantis

Lords of the Underworld

Tales of an Extraordinary Girl 

 Playing With Fire, September 2006 
 Twice as Hot, February 2010

Royal House of Shadows 
A series of 4 books each by a different author

 Lord of the Vampires by Gena Showalter (August 2011) 
 Lord of Rage by Jill Monroe (September 2011) 
 Lord of the Wolfyn by Jessica Andersen (October 2011) 
 Lord of the Abyss by Nalini Singh (December 2011)

Angels of the Dark 
The Angels of the Dark series takes place in the same universe as Lords of the Underworld series and concerns the armies of Heaven.

 Wicked Nights, June 2012  (Zacharel)
 Beauty Awakened, February 2013  (Koldo)
 Burning Dawn, May 2014 (Thane)

Otherworld Assassins 
The Otherworld Assassins series takes place in the same universe as the Alien Huntress series. It deals with a different Black Ops group.

 Last Kiss Goodnight, December 2012, Cover art by Nathália Suellen  (Solomon Judah & Vika Lukas)
 Black and Blue, October 2013  (Corbin Blue & Evangeline Black)
 Dark Swan in Blood Red Kiss anthology, September 2016  (Dallas Gutierrez & Lilica Swan)

Gods of War 

 Shadow and Ice (October 2018)-Knox of Iviland
 Frost and Flame (September 24, 2019)-Bane of Adwaeweth

Rise of the Warlords

Immortal Enemies

Non-fiction 

 Dating The Undead - Loving The Immortal Man December 27, 2011

Adult Contemporary Romance

Original Heartbreakers 

 The One You Want in The All For You Anthology, December 2014
 The Closer You Come, March 2015
 The Hotter You Burn, July 2015
 The Harder You Fall, November 2015
 Can't Hardly Breathe, August 2017
 Can't Let Go, October 2017
 Can't Get Enough, December 2017 (Self-published)

A Jane Ladling Mystery 
with Jill Monroe

Young Adult

Stand Alone Novels 

 Oh My Goth, July 2006 , Revised edition, September 4, 2018

Teen Alien Huntress 

 Red Handed, June 2007 
 Blacklisted, July 2007

Intertwined 

 Intertwined, September 2009 
 Unraveled, August 2010 
 Twisted, August 2011

White Rabbit Chronicles 

 Alice in Zombieland, September 2012 
 Through the Zombie Glass, October 2013
 The Queen of Zombie Hearts, September 2014
 A Mad Zombie Party, September 2015
 Kat in Zombieland, February 2017 (short story taking place during A Mad Zombie Party)

 Down the Rabbit Hole, February 2019 (collection of two bonus scenes from the series)

Everlife 

 Firstlife, February 2016
 Lifeblood, February 2017
 Everlife, February 2018

The Forest of Good and Evil 

 The Evil Queen (June 25, 2019)
 The Glass Queen(September 29, 2020)

Anthologies

References

External links 
 Showalter's Official Web Site
 Showalter's UK Publisher Web Site
 Gena Showalter's Official Wattpad Profile

1975 births
21st-century American novelists
American romantic fiction writers
American women novelists
Living people
Women romantic fiction writers
21st-century American women writers
American paranormal romance writers
American young adult novelists
Novelists from Oklahoma